Karakoro may refer to:

Karakoro, Ivory Coast
Karakoro, Mali
Karakoro River